William Hickton may refer to:

 William Hickton (cricketer, born 1842) (1842–1900), English cricketer
 William Hickton (cricketer, born 1884) (1884–1942), his son, English cricketer